Clytodora (Ancient Greek: Κλυτοδώρα) is a name in Greek mythology that may refer to:

Clytodora, a Trojan princess as the daughter of Laomedon, probably either by Placia, Strymo (or Rhoeo), Leucippe or Zeuxippe. Clytodora was the (half) sister of Priam, Astyoche, Lampus, Hicetaon, Clytius, Cilla, Proclia, Aethilla, Medesicaste, and Hesione. She became the queen of Dardania when she married Assaracus and became the mother of Capys. In some accounts, the wife of Assaracus was called Hieromneme, the naiad daughter of Simoes.
Clytodora, possible spouse of Minyas and mother of Clymene (Periclymene), Orchomenus, Presbon, Athamas, Diochthondas and Eteoclymene.

Notes

References 

 Dionysus of Halicarnassus, Roman Antiquities. English translation by Earnest Cary in the Loeb Classical Library, 7 volumes. Harvard University Press, 1937–1950. Online version at Bill Thayer's Web Site
 Dionysius of Halicarnassus, Antiquitatum Romanarum quae supersunt, Vol I-IV. . Karl Jacoby. In Aedibus B.G. Teubneri. Leipzig. 1885. Greek text available at the Perseus Digital Library.
 Gaius Julius Hyginus, Fabulae from The Myths of Hyginus translated and edited by Mary Grant. University of Kansas Publications in Humanistic Studies. Online version at the Topos Text Project.
 Pseudo-Apollodorus, The Library with an English Translation by Sir James George Frazer, F.B.A., F.R.S. in 2 Volumes, Cambridge, MA, Harvard University Press; London, William Heinemann Ltd. 1921. . Online version at the Perseus Digital Library. Greek text available from the same website.

Princesses in Greek mythology
Queens in Greek mythology
Minyan characters in Greek mythology